The 35th (Likens') Texas Cavalry Regiment was a unit of mounted volunteers from Texas that fought in the Confederate States Army during the American Civil War. The regiment was formed by consolidating Likens' Texas Cavalry Battalion and Burns' Texas Cavalry Battalion in October 1863. James B. Likens was appointed to lead the new unit, which was in a brigade first led by Hamilton P. Bee and later by Arthur P. Bagby Jr.. It fought at Mansfield and Pleasant Hill in 1864. The regiment moved to Beaumont, Texas, in early 1865, and surrendered there in June 1865.

See also
List of Texas Civil War Confederate units

Notes

References

Units and formations of the Confederate States Army from Texas
1863 establishments in Texas
1865 disestablishments in Texas
Military units and formations disestablished in 1865
Military units and formations established in 1863